Modern Railways is a British monthly magazine covering the rail transport industry which was published by Ian Allan until March 2012, and Key Publishing since then.  It has been published since 1962. The magazine was originally based in Shepperton, Middlesex.

It has always been targeted at both railway professionals and serious amateurs, an aim which derives from its origins as an amalgamation of the enthusiast magazine Trains Illustrated and the industry journal The Locomotive in the hands of its first editor Geoffrey Freeman Allen.

It is currently edited by Philip Sherratt after the retirement of James Abbott. Regular contributors include Roger Ford, Ian Walmsley, Alan Williams and Tony Miles. The large section regularly written by Roger Ford is called ‘Informed Sources’. That by Ian Walmsley is called ‘Pan Up’.

Trains Illustrated
The first edition of Trains Illustrated was published at the beginning of 1946. Due to post-war paper shortages issues 1 to 8 appeared at varied intervals in 1946 and 1947. From issue 9 (April 1948) it was published quarterly, from issue 14 (August–September 1949) it became bi-monthly, and from issue 17 (February 1950) it became a monthly publication. The final issue under that title was volume XIV, no.159 (December 1961), after which the sequence continued under the Modern Railways title.

Early issues were edited by Ian Allan and O.J.Morris, with Cecil J Allen taking over from issue 5 and G. Freeman Allen from issue 20; he remained editor until December 1961.

First edition
The first edition of Modern Railways was published in January 1962 as Volume XV, no. 160 in a sequence continuing from Trains Illustrated.  It featured a preface letter from Dr Richard Beeching, then Chairman of the British Transport Commission, who wrote: 

A feature article in the edition analysed peak traffic operations at Reading railway station in the days leading up to Christmas 1960, stating:

Gallery

See also
 List of rail transport-related periodicals
 Rail transport in Great Britain
 RAIL

References

Bibliography

External links
 Modern Railways Official Website

1962 establishments in the United Kingdom
Hobby magazines published in the United Kingdom
Magazines established in 1962
Magazines published in London
Mass media in Kent
Monthly magazines published in the United Kingdom
Rail transport magazines published in the United Kingdom